Solitude is a state of personal isolation from others.

Solitude may also refer to:

Music
 Solitude Aeturnus, formerly Solitude, an American metal band

Albums
 Solitude (Billie Holiday album) or the title cover of the Duke Ellington song (see below), 1956
 Solitude (King Midas Sound album), 2019
 Solitude (The The album) or the title song, 1993
 Solitude (EP), by Tori Kelly, 2020
 Solitude, by Frank Duval, 1991
 Solitude, by Gunmetal Grey
 Solitude, by Kosheen, 2013
 Solitude, by Morris Albert, 1981

Songs
 "(In My) Solitude", composed by Duke Ellington, 1934
 "Solitude" (Candlemass song), 1986
 "Solitude", by Black Sabbath from Master of Reality, 1971
 "Solitude", by Days of the New from Days of the New, 1997
 "Solitude", by Jerry Cantrell from Degradation Trip Volumes 1 & 2, 2002
 "Solitude", by Joe Satriani from Black Swans and Wormhole Wizards, 2010
 "Solitude", by Gothminister from Anima Inferna, 2011
 "Solitude", by Northlane from Discoveries, 2011
 "Solitude", by M83 from Junk, 2016

Places
 Solitude, Indiana, an unincorporated community in Posey County, Indiana
 Solitude, Kentucky, an unincorporated community in Bullitt County, Kentucky
 Solitude, United States Virgin Islands, a settlement on the island of Saint Croix in the United States Virgin Islands
 Solitude, Virginia, an unincorporated community in Botetourt County, Virginia
 Solitude (Blacksburg, Virginia), a historic home located on the campus of Virginia Polytechnic Institute
 Solitude Mountain Resort, a ski area in Utah

Other
 Solitude (football ground), the oldest football stadium in Ireland
 Solitude Racetrack (Solitudering), a former racetrack in Stuttgart, Germany (1903–1965)
 Solituderennen, motorsports events at the Solitude racetrack
 The Solitude Mansion, a colonial-era mansion in Fairmount Park, Philadelphia (named after Castle Solitude)
 "Solitude" (Supergirl), an episode of the CBS television series Supergirl
 Solitude Trilogy, a 1992 documentary by pianist Glenn Gould
 , a poem by Lydia Sigourney (1834)
 "Solitude", a poem by Ella Wheeler Wilcox
 Castle Solitude (Schloss Solitude), a rococo palace in Stuttgart, Germany
 Solitude (Bazovský), a painting by Miloš Alexander Bazovský from 1957
 La Mulâtresse Solitude, a Guadeloupean freedom fighter
 Solitude, the capital city of Skyrim in The Elder Scrolls V: Skyrim

See also
 Solitudes, a brand of music created by Dan Gibson
 Zolitūde, a city district of Riga (Latvia)
 Zolitūde Station, railway stop in Zolitūde district of Riga